The 2015 Shakey's V-League Season was the 12th Season of a Filipino football league.

Open Conference

Format

Preliminaries (PL)
Single Round-robin. Top four teams qualified for the semifinals.

Semi-finals (SF)
The four semi-finalists will compete against each other in a single-round robin phase.
 Top two SF teams will compete for GOLD.
 Bottom two SF teams will compete for BRONZE.

Finals
The battle for GOLD and the battle for BRONZE will both follow the best-of-three format, provided:
 If the battle for GOLD ends in two matches (2-0), then there will no longer be a Game 3 for either GOLD or Bronze. A tie in BRONZE (1-1) will be resolve using FIVB rules.
 A tie in the series for GOLD (1-1) after Game 2 will be broken in a Game 3, regardless of the result of the series in BRONZE.

Participating Teams

Results

Preliminaries

|}

|}

Semi-finals

|}

|}

Finals

Battle for Bronze

Battle for Gold

Final standing

Individual Awards

Collegiate Conference

References

Shakey's V-League seasons
2015 in Philippine sport